Tarquinio Angiolin (12 April 1928 – 28 November 2012) was an Italian rower. He competed in the men's coxed four event at the 1952 Summer Olympics.

References

1928 births
2012 deaths
Italian male rowers
Olympic rowers of Italy
Rowers at the 1952 Summer Olympics